A foot stove consists of a wooden box which is open on one side, with holes or a slab at the top. In it, a bowl made of pottery or metal with burning charcoal was placed. The feet were positioned on top of the stove to become warm. By putting a blanket or clothing on the legs the heat could be isolated and the lower legs were heated.

Foot stoves were used in Northern Germany, the Netherlands, and the United States.

See also
Korsi, a similar Iranian item
Kotatsu, a similar Japanese item

References

External links
  
Foot stoves from the Vermeer inventory
Dutch foot stove dated 1675, Albany Institute of History & Art 
Metal and wood foot stove
Tin and wood foot stove, c. 1765 

Heaters
Stoves